This is a list of landmark cases of the Supreme Court of Japan.

Footnotes

See also
Politics of Japan
Japanese law
Judicial System of Japan
2008 Decisions of the Supreme Court of Japan

References
Decisions of The Supreme Court of Japan (Japanese language)
Decisions of The Supreme Court of Japan (English language, does not include latest cases)
Teruki Tsunemoto, Trends in Japanese Constitutional Law Cases: Important Judicial Decisions for 2004, trans. Daryl Takeno, Asian-Pacific Law & Policy Journal
Teruki Tsunemoto, Trends in Japanese Constitutional Law Cases: Important Legal Precedents for 2005, trans. John Donovan, Yuko Funaki, and Jennifer Shimada, Asian-Pacific Law & Policy Journal
Teruki Tsunemoto, Trends in Japanese Constitutional Law Cases: Important Legal Precedents for 2006, trans. Asami Miyazawa and Angela Thompson, Asian-Pacific Law & Policy Journal
Teruki Tsunemoto, Trends in Japanese Constitutional Law Cases: Important Legal Precedents for 2007, trans. Mark A. Levin and Jesse Smith, Asian-Pacific Law & Policy Journal

Japanese case law
Legal history of Japan